Shakila (1 January 1935 – 20 September 2017) was an Indian actress, best known for her roles in Guru Dutt's films: Aar Paar (1954) and C.I.D. (1956). Shakila's was born as Badshah Begum on 1 January 1935 in the Middle East. Her younger sisters are Noor Jehan (nicknamed Noor) and Nasreen. Their ancestors belonged to the royal families of Afghanistan and Iran. Their paternal grandparents and mother were killed during family feuds over the throne. Their father and his sister Feroza Begum brought the children to Mumbai, India. Shakila and her sisters faced tough times, since their father died soon afterwards. Her aunt, who was engaged to marry a prince, lost him in an accident, and she decided to remain unmarried and raise her three nieces.

Career 

Her aunt was fond of movies and took the girls to showings. Their family was on friendly terms with Kardar and Mehboob Khan. In fact, it was 'Kardar' who offered her the chance to act in Dastaan (1949). She took the name Shakila and made her debut as a child artiste in the film, which starred Suraiya. She quickly acted in another film with Suraiya titled Duniya (1949). After working in some routine films in secondary roles including Gumasta (1951), Sindbad the Sailor (1952), Rajrani Damyanti (1952), Aagosh (1953), Shahenshah (1953), Raj Mahal (1953), Armaan (1953), people finally noticed her in Guru Dutt's Aar-Paar (1954). In Aar-Paar, she played the other woman in Guru Dutt's life, the cabaret dancer, who is disdained by society and is a complex and embittered person. Aar-Paar was a superhit film and its best songs were picturized on Shakila. Her sister Noor also acted in Aar-Paar (1954) and later married famous comedian Johnny Walker and quit films, as did Nasreen, who became a housewife.

Dutt was impressed with Shakila's performance to repeat her in Raj Khosla's C.I.D. (1956), but she was eclipsed by Dutt's protégé Waheeda Rehman who made her debut in that film. Shakila's aunt was managing her career and she didn't want Shakila to be typecast in fantasy films, so she quoted a large sum of Rs. 10000 for Alibaba and Forty Thieves (1954) thinking it would dissuade the producer from casting her, but he agreed and she acted in the film. It became a hit. As a consequence, Shakila was reduced to B-grade mythological and fantasy films and she earned the title "Arbi Chehra" (Arabian Princess) from the film fraternity. She acted in Lalpari (1954), Veer Rajputani (1955), Roop Kumari (1956), Agra Road (1957), Al-Hilal (1958) etc. She played a ethereal fairy in "Hatim Tai" (1956), which is an A-grade color hit film, based on an Arabian Nights tale. She created some stir in 1957, when her film opposite Kishore Kumar - Begunah was banned after 10 days of its release. The film was a carbon copy of Hollywood's Knock on Wood (1954) starring Danny Kaye and the producers of that film went to court and won the case to stop the further screening of this film. As a consequence, all the negatives of this film were destroyed. In 1958, she starred opposite Sunil Dutt in suspense/thriller Post Box. 999. In the latter part of her career, Shakti Samanta cast her in China Town (1962) opposite Shammi Kapoor, and the songs became a rage.

During the course of her fourteen-year career, she appeared in more than 50 films with well-known actors and directors. After that, she quit the industry and got married and moved to London with her husband, Y M Elias . After her marriage ended, she came back to Mumbai and remarried to an Afghan man who was the Consulate General in India. They had a daughter Meenaz together, and they went to live abroad. In 1991, she suffered a terrible blow when her daughter jumped to her death. Putting the tragedy behind her, she moved back to Mumbai and stayed close to her sisters and friends. She declined all film and television serial offers and refused to make a comeback, since she wanted fans to remember her as a young, beautiful heroine. She died of a massive heart attack at the age of 82 on 20 September 2017 in Mumbai, India.  Shakila was buried at Mahim cemetery in Mumbai, Maharashtra.

Shakila's sister Noor (short for Noorjehan) was married to Johnny Walker.

Filmography

References

External links
 
 

Indian film actresses
Place of birth missing
Indian expatriates in the United Kingdom
1935 births
2017 deaths
Actresses in Urdu cinema
Actresses in Hindi cinema
20th-century Indian actresses